Hard Love Stories is the third and final studio album by Sneaky Feelings released in 1988

Track listing
Side A
In The Shape Of A Heart - 3:47
Your Secret's Safe With Me - 2:07
Dad And The Family Dog - 3:51
Further And Further Away From You - 5:36
Parked - 2:11

Side B
This Must Be The Verse - 1:05
Hard Love - 3:04
Levin Dream - 2:45
Discipline - 2:33
Take Me There - 3:38

Personnel
Martin Durrant - drums, vocals
Matthew Bannister - guitar, vocals
David Pine - guitar, vocals
John Kelcher - bass guitar, vocals

References

1988 albums
Flying Nun Records albums
Sneaky Feelings albums